Gutierrezia texana is a North American species of flowering plant in the family Asteraceae known by the common name Texas snakeweed. It is native to the south-central United States (New Mexico, Texas, Oklahoma, southwestern Arkansas, northwestern Louisiana) and northern Mexico as far south as Guanajuato and Hidalgo.

The plant produces numerous flower heads in loose arrays. Each head usually has 5-36 ray flowers (though sometimes no rays) plus 7–48 disc flowers.

Varieties
Gutierrezia texana var. glutinosa (S.Schauer) M.A.Lane 
Gutierrezia texana var. texana

References

External links
USDA Plants Profile for Gutierrezia texana (Texas snakeweed)
Photo of herbarium specimen at Missouri Botanical Garden, collected in Texas in 1828 — isotype of Gutierrezia texana.

texana
Flora of Texas
Flora of Northeastern Mexico
Flora of Arkansas
Flora of Louisiana
Flora of Missouri
Flora of New Mexico
Flora of Oklahoma
Plants described in 1836
Taxa named by Asa Gray
Taxa named by Augustin Pyramus de Candolle
Taxa named by John Torrey
Flora without expected TNC conservation status